The New Adventures of the Time Machine is an adventure video game released in 2000, developed and published by Cryo Interactive. It is based on H. G. Wells' novella The Time Machine.

Production

Design 
During development the characters and backgrounds began as wire frames.

The game features Real time 3D animation in pre-rendered sets, using the 'Warp' technology.

Plot 
A mythical being, a Demi-God, The Master of the Hourglass: Khronos, is the only one who can restore the balance of time, and help you find your own time again.

Reception 
Market research firm PC Data reported North American retail sales of 11,252 copies for Time Machine during 2000. The firm tabulated another 18,097 retail sales of the game in North America during 2001, and 21,585 during the first six months of 2002. In 2003, its jewel case SKU secured 16,747 sales in the region.

GameSpot thought the game alternated between a "nonsensical story" and "infuriating puzzles". IGN felt that the game didn't push the boundaries for Cryo and tested player's patience. Jeux Video praised the game's beauty and interactivity. Eurogamer praised the story and graphics and gave the game a 9/10. John Walker of Rock Paper Shotgun criticised the premise of making H. G. Wells the time traveling protagonist himself.

References

External links 
 The New Adventures of the Time Machine at Microïds

2000 video games
Adventure games
Cryo Interactive games
Microïds games
Video games developed in France
Windows games
Windows-only games